Local elections were held in 2021 for Denmark's 98 municipal councils and five regional councils. All 2,436 seats were contested for the 2022–2025 term of office, together with 205 seats in five regional councils. Frederiksberg Municipality had increased their number of councillors from 25 to 29.

Opinion polls

Results

Results of regional elections 

The regions are not municipalities but are financed only through block grants.

Number of councillors and political parties in the regional councils

Old and new chairs of the regional councils
In four of the five regions, the incumbent chairman kept the position. However, in the North Denmark Region, an agreement was made between Venstre, the Danish People's Party, New Right and the Conservative People's Party to give the chairmanship to Mads Duedahl of Venstre. This was the first time since the region's establishment in 2007 that the Social Democrats did not win the region's chairmanship.

Results of municipal elections
Seats for the 98 municipal councils were up for vote.

Number of councillors and political parties in the municipal councils
The Conservatives had their best local election results since 1985.

Number of absolute majorities (a majority of seats won by the party itself)

Number of municipal council elections contested and number of municipal councils representations by party

Mayors in the municipalities 

The mayors of the 98 municipalities head the council meetings and are the chair of the finance committee in each of their respective municipalities. Only in Copenhagen, this mayor – the head of the finance committee and council meetings – is called the lord mayor.

Sum of mayor positions and seats won by Folketing Constituency

North Jutland

West Jutland

East Jutland

South Jutland

Funen

Zealand

North Zealand

Greater Copenhagen

Copenhagen

Bornholm

Old and new mayors in the municipalities 

The term of office for the mayors elected by the majority of councillors among its members in each municipal council is the same as for the councils elected, namely 1 January 2022 until 31 December 2025. The correct name for the municipality on the somewhat remote island of Bornholm is Regional Municipality, because the municipality also handles several tasks not carried out by the other Danish municipalities but by the regions.

Notes

References

Local and municipal elections in Denmark
Denmark
 
November 2021 events in Denmark